Zakkum are a Turkish rock group. It was created in 1999 under the name Raindog in Ankara. Raindog had many stage performances, before they started working on an album and chose a Turkish name "Zakkum" for their band.

Career 
The group dates back to 1998. Cem Senyücel, Yusuf Demirkol and Eren Parlakgümüş were each following their solo music career until they were brought together with the idea of forming a group. They initially started to perform at Sinema Bar and subsequently appeared on stage in many other places. Emre Yılmaztürk joined as the fourth and last member in 2003.

Until 2004, they primarily performed and covered the works of Placebo, Radiohead, Morrissey, The Smiths, The Cure, The Smashing Pumpkins, Suede and eventually began to release their own songs.

Discography 
Studio albums
 Zehr-i Zakkum (2007)	
 13 (2011)
 Ben Böyle Değildim (2012)
 Hergün Sonbahar (2013)
 Bir Gece Yarası (2016)
 Duble, Vol. 1 (2020)
 Duble, Vol. 2 (2020)

Videography 
 "Ah Çikolata"	
 "Zehr-i Zakkum" (duet with Teoman)
 "Ahtapotlar"	
 "Hipokondriyak"
 "Anlıyorsun"
 "Yüzük"
 "Anason"
 "Ahtapotlar (Akustik)"
 "Ben Böyle Değildim"
 "Teslim Ol"
 "Ben Ne Yangınlar Gördüm"
 "Her Gün Sonbahar"
 "Gidiyorum Yolcu Et"
 "Gökyüzünde"
 "Acıta Acıta"
 "Dile Kolay Kalbe Değil"
 "Al Gece Yarılarımı Benden"
 "Sen Hala Benimlesin"
 "İkimiz de Yorgunuz"
 "Hatıran Yeter"
 "Müsaade Senin" (feat. Ceylan Köse)
 "Bilemedim"
 "Güneşimi Kaybettim"
 "Gülü Susuz"
 "Elveda"
 "Hüzzam"
 "Elbet Bir Gün"
 "Kalbin Delikti"
 "Birlikte Buruşsun Ellerimiz"
 "Bütün Şarkılar Biter"
 "Seni Rastgele Sevmedim"

References

External links 

Myspace
Spotify

Musical groups established in 1999
Musical quartets
Musical groups from Ankara
1999 establishments in Turkey